James Michael May (born 30 January 1968) is a male retired British gymnast. May competed at the 1992 Summer Olympics where he finished 33rd in the individual all around and 12th with Great Britain in the team final. He won five medals at the 1990 Commonwealth Games in Auckland, New Zealand, when representing England. He won a gold medal in the vault, two silver medals in the team event and rings, and two bronze medals in the all-around and pommel horse.

References

External links
 

1968 births
Living people
British male artistic gymnasts
Olympic gymnasts of Great Britain
Gymnasts at the 1992 Summer Olympics
People from Seaton, Devon
Commonwealth Games medallists in gymnastics
Commonwealth Games gold medallists for England
Commonwealth Games silver medallists for England
Commonwealth Games bronze medallists for England
Gymnasts at the 1990 Commonwealth Games
Team Bath athletes
Medallists at the 1990 Commonwealth Games